Golden Eagle Award for Best Actress (Chinese name: 中国电视金鹰奖最佳女主角, 1983–1999; 中国电视金鹰奖观众喜爱的女演员, 2003–2018, 最佳女演员, 2020-now) is a main category of the China TV Golden Eagle Award. From 2003 to 2014, the title of Best Actress (视后) was given to the winner who won both the Golden Eagle Award's Audience's Choice and the festival's Performing Arts awards. The top honour is voted in by a panel of judges, the China Television Artists Association and the national audience. This category was absent during 2000–2002. Since 2020, the award has been split from Audience's Choice for Actor, and is voted in by a panel of judges and the CTAA.

Records

 Actresses who also won leading actress in a motion picture of China Literary and Art Circles Awards:
 Golden Rooster Award for Best Actress : Li Ling, Xi Meijuan, Yue Hong, Tao Hong, Ni Ping, Jiang Wenli, Zhou Xun, Song Jia
 Hundred Flowers Award for Best Actress : Liu Bei, Zhou Xun, Zhao Wei,  Da Song Jia

Winners and nominees

2020s

2010s

2000s

1990s

1980s

References

External links
 Past Winners of Golden Eagles

Television awards for Best Actress
Actress